Križić is a Croatian surname. Notable people with the surname include:

Zdenko Križić (born 1953), Croatian Roman Catholic prelate
Martin Krizic (born 2003), Austrian footballer

Croatian surnames